Don't Have to Worry is an album by blues musician Earl Hooker released by the BluesWay label in 1969.

Track listing
All compositions credited to Earl Hooker except where noted
 "The Sky Is Crying" (Elmore James, M. C. Robinson) – 4:17
 "Hookin'" – 4:17
 "Is You Ever Seen a One-Eyed Woman Cry" (Johnny Walker) – 3:42
 "You Got to Lose" – 5:42
 "Blue Guitar" – 3:51
 "Moanin' and Groanin'" (Andrew Odom) – 4:47
 "Universal Rock" – 4:08
 "Look Over Yonder Wall" (James Clark) – 3:05
 "Don't Have to Worry" – 4:18
 "Come to Me Right Away, Baby" (Odom) – 3:42

Personnel
Earl Hooker – guitar, vocals
Little Andrew "Blues Boy" Odom – lead vocals (tracks 1, 6 & 10)
Paul Asbell  – guitar 
Jeffrey Carp – harmonica
Johnny "Big Moose" Walker – piano, organ, vocals
Chester E. "Gino" Skaggs – bass
Roosevelt Shaw – drums

References

Earl Hooker albums
1969 albums
BluesWay Records albums